Czecho Slovak Commercial Corporation of America was an American importer of products from Czechoslovakia.  The company was founded in 1917.  In October 1922, the company changed its name to Penn Commercial Corporation of America, Inc.

Directors, executives, and employees 
Founding incorporators
 Anthony S. Ambrose (1867–1941), president and director
 Ivan Bielek (1886–1943), vice-president and director (signatory party to the Pittsburgh Agreement)
 Clement Ihrisky (1876–1940)
 Michael J. Bosak, Jr. (1894–1979)
Employoee
 Robert Juzek (1894–1975), secretary in 1920

Addresses 
 1920: 59 Pearl Street, New York City
 1922: 151 Fifth Avenue, New York City

References 

Business services companies established in 1917
1917 establishments in New York (state)